Greenspot, California may refer to:
Greenspot, Contra Costa County, California
Greenspot, San Bernardino County, California